Allah Abad is a town and Union Council in Punjab, Pakistan. It is located in Tehsil Liaqatpur, the district of Rahim Yar Khan.

History
Allah Abad is one of the oldest towns in Bahawalpur. When it was a princely state, Allah Abad was used as a second unofficial capital after Dera Nawab. Now, this town is a union council of Liaquatpur. It has one of the most popular school in Rahimyarkhan District, namely, Allah Abad Government Secondary High School.

Transport
Allahabad is linked with Liaquatpur with two way 6.5 km. asphalt road. On the other end, it is linked with Jan Pur, a main hub on KLP road. On the west with Amin Abad, another town approximately 9 kilometers far from Allah Abad

See also
Muhammad Saifullah, a former Minister of Religious Affairs in the Government of Pakistan
Liaqat Pur, Tehsil in Punjab, Pakistan

Populated places in Rahim Yar Khan District